Cléden-Cap-Sizun is a commune in the Finistère department of Brittany in north-western France, lying on the promontory of Cap Sizun.

Population
Inhabitants of Cléden-Cap-Sizun are called in French Clédinois.

International relations

Cléden-Cap-Sizun is twinned with Ballydehob, Co. Cork, Ireland.

See also
Communes of the Finistère department

References

External links
Official website 

 Mayors of Finistère Association  

Communes of Finistère
Populated coastal places in France